Solomon Islands will compete at the 2022 World Aquatics Championships in Budapest, Hungary from 18 June to 3 July.

Swimming

Swimmers from Solomon Islands have achieved qualifying standards in the following events.

References

Nations at the 2022 World Aquatics Championships
Solomon Islands at the World Aquatics Championships
2022 in Solomon Islands sport